Now Deh-e Hajjilar (also Romanized as Now Deh-e Ḩājjīlar; also known as Now Deh-e Esmā‘īl Khān and Now Deh) is a village in Khormarud-e Jonubi Rural District, Cheshmeh Saran District, Azadshahr County, Golestan Province, Iran. At the 2006 census, its population was 822, in 209 families.

References 

Populated places in Azadshahr County